Khon Kaen Mordindang Football Club (Thai สโมสรฟุตบอลขอนแก่น มอดินแดง), is a Thai professional football club based in Mueang, Khon Kaen, Thailand. The club is currently playing in the Thai League 3 Northeastern region.

History
In 2018, the club was established and competed in the 2018 Thailand Amateur League Northeastern region, using the stadium of Khon Kaen university as the ground. At the end of the season, they have promoted to the 2019 Thai League 4.

In 2019, the club become a professional football club. Khon Kaen Mordindang competed in the Thai League 4 for the 2019 season. The club has finished fourth place in the league of the Northeastern region.

In 2020, the Football Association of Thailand merged the Thai League 3 and Thai League 4. As a result of this incident, all teams in Thai League 4 were promoted to Thai League 3. Khon Kaen Mordindang competed in the Thai League 3 for the 2020–21 season. In late December 2020, the Coronavirus disease 2019 or also known as COVID-19 had spread again in Thailand, the FA Thailand must abruptly end the regional stage of the Thai League 3. The club has finished the ninth place of the Northeastern region. In the 2020 Thai League Cup, Khon Kaen Mordindang have competed for this tournament, they have won to Nakhon Ratchasima United in the first qualification round. However, the FA Thailand must cancel the Thai League Cup this year due to the spreading of COVID-19.

In 2021, the 2021–22 season is the second consecutive season in the Thai League 3 of Khon Kaen Mordindang. They started the season with a 0–3 home defeated to Muang Loei United and they ended the season with a 0–2 away defeated to the Muang Loei United. The club has finished tenth place in the league of the Northeastern region. In addition, in the 2021–22 Thai FA Cup Khon Kaen Mordindang defeated 1–5 to Songkhla in the second round, causing them to be eliminated. While in the 2021–22 Thai League Cup Khon Kaen Mordindang defeated 0–1 to Udon United in the first qualification round, causing them to be eliminated too.

In 2022, the 2022–23 season is the third consecutive season in the Thai League 3 of Khon Kaen Mordindang.

Stadium and locations

Season by season record

P = Played
W = Games won
D = Games drawn
L = Games lost
F = Goals for
A = Goals against
Pts = Points
Pos = Final position

QR1 = First Qualifying Round
QR2 = Second Qualifying Round
R1 = Round 1
R2 = Round 2
R3 = Round 3
R4 = Round 4

R5 = Round 5
R6 = Round 6
QF = Quarter-finals
SF = Semi-finals
RU = Runners-up
W = Winners

Players

Current squad

Coaching staff

References

External links
 Thai League official website

Association football clubs established in 2018
Football clubs in Thailand
Khon Kaen province
2018 establishments in Thailand